Ma Dong is iQIYI's chief content officer and a veteran producer, director, and host. Before coming to iQIYI, he worked for China Central Television from 2001 to 2013, having previously hosted programs at Henan Television.

Ma continues to host online TV shows, such as Exotic Stories, which first aired on iQIYI in 2014. He graduated from Beijing Film Academy. He is the son of renowned xiangsheng comedian Ma Ji.

References

External links
 

Beijing Film Academy alumni
Chinese television producers
Living people
Year of birth missing (living people)
Chinese television talk show hosts
IQIYI people